Percival Richard O'Driscoll (born 4 October 1934) is a Canadian Anglican bishop.

O'Driscoll was educated at Bishop's University and he was ordained in 1964. He was a curate at St Matthias, Ottawa then at St John the Evangelist, Kitchener. He then held incumbencies at St Michael & All Angels, London and St Batholomew's, Sarnia. He was Dean of Huron (1980–86) and then its suffragan bishop from his election in 1987. In 1989, he became the coadjutor bishop, by which he automatically succeeded as diocesan bishop in 1991, serving until 1999. and also Metropolitan of Ontario for the last seven years of his episcopate.

References

 

1934 births
Bishop's University alumni
Deans of Huron
Anglican bishops of Huron
20th-century Anglican Church of Canada bishops
Metropolitans of Ontario
20th-century Anglican archbishops
Living people